Quasimitra sanguinolenta is a species of sea snail, a marine gastropod mollusk in the family Mitridae, the miters or miter snails.

Description
The length of the shell attains 27.8 mm.

Distribution
This marine species occurs off Madagascar.

References

 Bozzetti (2009). Malacologia Mostra Mondiale 63 (2) : 7-8

External links
 ) Lamarck (J.B.M.de). (1811). Suite de la détermination des espèces de Mollusques testacés. Mitre (Mitra.). Annales du Muséum National d'Histoire Naturelle. 17: 195-222.
 Cate J.M. (1966). A new name for Mitra sanguinolenta Lamarck, 1811. The Veliger. 9(2): 239-241, pl. 23
 Fedosov A., Puillandre N., Herrmann M., Kantor Yu., Oliverio M., Dgebuadze P., Modica M.V. & Bouchet P. (2018). The collapse of Mitra: molecular systematics and morphology of the Mitridae (Gastropoda: Neogastropoda). Zoological Journal of the Linnean Society. 183(2): 253-337

sanguinolenta
Gastropods described in 1811